Wang Ji (190 – 9 June 261), courtesy name Boyu, was a military general of the state of Cao Wei during the Three Kingdoms period of China. He started his career as a low-ranking official under Wang Ling, the governor of Qing Province. During this time, he was noted for exemplary performance and was later transferred to the central government in Luoyang. He was subsequently promoted to the position of a commandery administrator, but was briefly removed from office when the Wei regent Sima Yi ousted his co-regent Cao Shuang in a coup d'état in 249. However, he was quickly recalled to government service, promoted to the position of governor of Jing Province and appointed as a military general. From 251 until his death in 261, Wang Ji maintained close but professional working relationships with the Wei regents Sima Shi and Sima Zhao. During this time, he supervised military operations in Jing, Yu and Yang provinces, and defended Wei's eastern and southern borders against attacks by Wei's rival state, Eastern Wu. He also assisted Sima Shi and Sima Zhao in suppressing two of the three Shouchun rebellions in 255 and 257–258 respectively. In 261, in the months just before his death, he correctly pointed out that two Eastern Wu military officers were pretending to defect to Wei, and managed to stop the Wei forces from falling into a trap.

Early life
Wang Ji was from Qucheng County, Donglai Commandery, which is located northwest of present-day Zhaoyuan, Shandong. He was born in 190 towards the end of the Eastern Han dynasty. As he lost his father at a young age, he was raised by his uncle Wang Weng, who treated him well. In return, Wang Ji was very filial towards his uncle.

When Wang Ji turned 16, the local commandery office recruited him to serve as an assistant official. He quit later after realising that he was not interested in the job. He then went to Langya Commandery (琅邪郡; around present-day Linyi, Shandong) for further studies under the Confucian scholar Zheng Xuan.

As Wang Ling's subordinate
Sometime between 220 and 226, the administrative office of Donglai Commandery nominated Wang Ji as a xiaolian (civil service candidate) to the central government of the Cao Wei state. Wang Ji was subsequently appointed him as a Gentleman Cadet. Around the time, Wang Ling, who had recently assumed office as the Inspector of Qing Province, recruited Wang Ji to serve as an attendant officer under him. Later, when Wang Ji was summoned to the imperial capital Luoyang to serve as a librarian, Wang Ling successfully sought permission from the central government to let Wang Ji remain in Qing Province.

Wang Lang, the Minister over the Masses, once asked Wang Ling to transfer Wang Ji to his office in Luoyang. When Wang Ling refused, Wang Lang wrote to the imperial court to accuse Wang Ling of holding back talents: "Street-level officials who have performed exceptionally well should be promoted to commandery level. Commandery-level officials who have shown good performance should be recommended to the central government. This practice originated from the ancient custom of nobles presenting local talents to their rulers. I have never heard of any regional official refusing to allow his subordinates to serve in the central government." Despite Wang Lang's accusation, Wang Ling refused to allow Wang Ji to leave. Throughout his tenure in Qing Province, much of Wang Ling's achievements were actually due to Wang Ji's efforts.

Service in the central government
Sometime between 230 and 235, Sima Yi, the General-in-Chief of Wei, summoned Wang Ji to serve under him. Wang Ling had no choice but to let Wang Ji leave. Before Wang Ji reached Sima Yi's office, however, he was quickly reassigned to be a Palace Writer Gentleman.

During his reign from 226 to 239, the Wei emperor Cao Rui started lavish and extravagant palace-building projects. As these projects were  labour intensive, they took a heavy toll on the common people, who were recruited as labourers for the projects. Wang Ji wrote a memorial to Cao Rui to advise him to stop the projects: 

Wang Su was known for writing commentaries and annotations on Confucian texts, as well as for expressing his opinions on imperial protocol, etiquette and customs. His views deviated largely from those of the Confucian scholar Zheng Xuan. As Wang Ji studied and followed Zheng Xuan's teachings, he often challenged and disagreed with Wang Su.

Wang Ji was subsequently promoted to the position of Administrator of Anping Commandery (安平郡; around present-day Hengshui, Hebei). He resigned later because of official reasons.

As the Administrator of Anfeng
Sometime between 239 and 249, Cao Shuang, the General-in-Chief of Wei, summoned Wang Ji to serve as an Assistant Gentleman under him. Wang Ji was later promoted to the position of Administrator of Anfeng Commandery (安豐郡; around present-day Lu'an, Anhui).

During his tenure, Wang Ji governed his jurisdiction strictly but fairly. He also performed some acts of kindness from time to time to win popular support from the masses. As Anfeng Commandery was located near the border between Wei and its rival state Eastern Wu, Wang Ji also set up and strengthened its defences to deter the enemy. He was subsequently given an additional appointment as General Who Attacks Rebels.

Sometime between 245 and 252, there were reports of Eastern Wu forces mobilising and gathering at the Wu imperial capital, Jianye (present-day Nanjing, Jiangsu). The Wu forces also publicly revealed that they were preparing to attack Wei territories in Yang Province. Zhuge Dan, the Wei governor of Yang Province, sought Wang Ji's opinion on how to counter a Wu invasion. Wang Ji replied:  As Wang Ji analysed correctly, Sun Quan did not launch any attack on Wei during this time.

When Cao Shuang was regent of Wei from 239 to 249, he monopolised power and practised cronyism, which resulted in political corruption and cultural decadence. Wang Ji wrote a text, "Shi Yao Lun" (時要論; "Essay on the Needs of the Time"), to express his views on contemporary politics. He then resigned from his post as the Administrator of Anfeng Commandery, using poor health as an excuse. He was soon recalled by the Wei government to serve as the Intendant of Henan. However, before he assumed office, Cao Shuang was ousted from power in a coup d'état by his co-regent, Sima Yi, and executed along with the rest of his family and associates. As Wang Ji used to be a subordinate of Cao Shuang, he was implicated in the purge and removed from office.

As the Inspector of Jing Province
Within the same year (249) after his removal from office, Wang Ji was summoned back to serve as a Master of Writing in the imperial secretariat. In the following year, he was promoted to Inspector of Jing Province and appointed as General Who Spreads Vehemence. Shortly after he assumed office, the Wei government ordered him to join the Wei general Wang Chang on a campaign against Eastern Wu.

During the battle, Wang Ji led an army to attack Wu forces led by Bu Xie at Yiling County (夷陵縣; in present-day Yichang, Hubei). Bu Xie and his men retreated behind the city walls, shut the gates and refused to engage Wang Ji in battle. Wang Ji then ordered his troops to pretend to prepare to attack the city, while secretly sending them to capture the Wu army's granary at Xiongfu. They managed to seize over 300,000 hu of grain and capture a Wu general, Tan Zheng. Thousands of Wu civilians surrendered to the Wei forces; Wang Ji made arrangements for them to be resettled in Yiling County. The Wei government awarded Wang Ji the title of a Secondary Marquis to honour him for his achievements.

Wang Ji wrote to Wang Chang and managed to convince him to relocate his base of operations to Jiangxia Commandery (江夏郡; around present-day Yunmeng County, Hubei), so that it was nearer to the Wei–Wu border at Xiakou (夏口; in present-day Wuhan, Hubei). After that, the Wu forces did not dare to readily cross the river to attack Wei territory as they did before.

During his tenure as the Inspector of Jing Province, Wang Jing governed his jurisdiction justly and fairly, maintained good discipline within the army and agricultural sector, and built many schools to promote education. He earned much praise from the residents of Jing Province.

Around the time, the Wei government wanted to launch a military campaign against Eastern Wu, so they ordered Wang Ji to come up with a strategy. Wang Ji said:  The campaign was thus aborted.

When Sima Shi succeeded his father Sima Yi as the regent of Wei in 251, Wang Ji wrote to him:  Sima Shi accepted Wang Ji's advice.

In 254, after Sima Shi deposed the Wei emperor Cao Fang and replaced him with Cao Mao, Wang Ji was elevated from the status of a secondary marquis to a village marquis under the title "Marquis of Changle Village".

Suppressing Guanqiu Jian and Wen Qin's rebellion

In 255, the Wei generals Guanqiu Jian and Wen Qin started a rebellion in Shouchun (壽春; around present-day Shou County, Anhui), the capital of Huainan Commandery, which was called the Chu State at the time. Wang Ji was appointed as acting Army Supervisor, granted acting imperial authority, and put in command of the Wei forces stationed in Xuchang. Sima Shi, the Wei regent, led troops from Luoyang, the Wei imperial capital, to suppress the rebellion and met Wang Ji at Xuchang.

When Sima Shi asked him what he thought of Guanqiu Jian and Wen Qin's actions, Wang Ji replied: "The local officials in Huainan aren't responsible for starting the rebellion. Guanqiu Jian and Wen Qin forced them to rebel by threatening to kill them if they didn't. They will collapse when imperial forces show up. It won't be long before we see Guanqiu Jian and Wen Qin's dead bodies being hung at the gates." Sima Shi agreed.

Sima Shi put Wang Ji in command of the vanguard force. At the time, many Wei officials believed that Guanqiu Jian and Wen Qin were powerful and difficult to defeat, so the Wei imperial court ordered Wang Ji to hold his position and refrain from engaging the rebels in battle. Wang Ji disagreed:  Wang Ji then repeatedly sought permission to attack the rebels. When approval was finally granted, Wang Ji led his troops towards the Yin River, where he sought permission to attack the rebels: 

Sima Shi wanted to wait until all the mobilised Wei forces had arrived before launching an attack on Shouchun, so he denied Wang Ji permission to attack first. Wang Ji then said: "When a general is out in the field, he doesn't always have to follow his lord's orders. If the rebels occupy territory, they make a gain. If we occupy territory, we make a gain. This is what it means to seize territory. I am referring to Nandun." Sima Shi approved and sent Wang Ji to occupy Nandun (南頓; west of present-day Xiangcheng, Henan). When Guanqiu Jian heard about it, he also led his forces towards Nandun. After travelling about 10 li, he heard that Wang Ji had already beat him to it and occupied Nandun, so he retreated back to Xiang County (項縣; present-day Shenqiu County, Henan).

Around the time, Deng Ai, the Inspector of Yan Province, was stationed with his troops at Yuejia (樂嘉; present-day Xiangcheng, Henan). When Wang Ji learnt that Guanqiu Jian had sent Wen Qin to lead a force to attack Deng Ai at Yuejia, he took advantage of the situation to attack and seize Xiang County from the rebels. After the rebellion was suppressed, Wang Ji was promoted to General Who Guards the South and put in charge of supervising military operations in Yu Province. He was also appointed as acting Inspector of Yu Province and promoted from a village marquis to a district marquis under the title "Marquis of Anle District". He wrote a memorial to the Wei imperial court, requesting to give away 200 taxable households from his marquisate to his cousin, Wang Qiao, as an expression of gratitude to his late uncle Wang Weng (王翁; Wang Qiao's father) for raising him when he was young. The imperial court approved his special request and enfeoffed Wang Qiao as a Secondary Marquis.

Suppressing Zhuge Dan's rebellion

When the Wei general Zhuge Dan started a rebellion in Shouchun (壽春; around present-day Shou County, Anhui) in 257, Wang Ji was appointed acting General Who Guards the East in addition to his existing appointment as General Who Guards the South. He was also put in charge of military operations in Yang and Yu provinces. At the time, the Wei imperial forces stationed at Xiang County (項縣; present-day Shenqiu County, Henan) did not dare to attack the rebels because they knew the rebels were seasoned soldiers. The Wei imperial court ordered Wang Ji to supervise the construction of defences and fortifications, and ignored his requests to attack the rebels.

Wei's rival state, Eastern Wu, sent Zhu Yi to lead Wu forces to Shouchun to support Zhuge Dan. The Wu forces made camp at Ancheng County (安城縣; southwest of present-day Pingyu County, Henan).

Wang Ji followed orders and led his troops to occupy the hills in the north. He told his officers: "The fortifications are already very solid and the troops have assembled here. We only need to maintain our defences and wait for the enemy to show up. If we continue to deploy our troops to guard strategic locations, we will only become even more scattered. When that happens, even the most intelligent people can't think of any solution to the problem." He then wrote a report to the Wei imperial court:  The imperial court approved.

Sima Zhao, the General-in-Chief of Wei, led imperial forces to Qiutou (丘頭; southeast of present-day Shenqiu County, Henan) and deployed them around the city to form a defence perimeter. At the time, Wang Ji commanded the 26 units stationed at the southeast of the city. Sima Zhao sent a messenger to meet Wang Ji and order him to hold his position and refrain from engaging the rebels in battle. Before long, the city ran out of supplies while the rebels increased the intensity of their attacks. Wang Ji continued to put up a firm defence and hold his ground. When the opportunity came, he launched a counterattack and defeated the rebels.

After suppressing Zhuge Dan's rebellion, Wang Ji wrote a letter to Sima Zhao: 

Sima Zhao wanted to ask Tang Zi and the Wu defectors to serve as guides in leading Wei forces deep into Wu territory to launch an attack. However, Wang Ji advised him against it:  Sima Zhao thus called off the attack on Wu.

After pacifying the Huainan region, Wang Ji was reassigned from his position as General Who Guards the South to General Who Attacks the East, and put in charge of military affairs in Yang Province. He was also elevated from the status of a district marquis to a county marquis under the title "Marquis of Dongwu". He wrote a memorial to the imperial court to decline the promotion, and gave the credit for suppressing the rebellion to all his subordinates. Seven chief clerks and army majors under him were thus awarded marquis titles.

When Wang Ji's mother died in 258, the Wei imperial court issued an edict ordering news of her death to be kept secret. The remains of Wang Ji's father, Wang Bao, were excavated and transferred to Luoyang for reburial together with Wang Ji's mother. The imperial court also posthumously appointed Wang Bao as the Administrator of Beihai Commandery.

As General Who Attacks the South
In 259, Wang Ji was reassigned from his position as General Who Attacks the East to General Who Attacks the South, and put in charge of supervising military operations in Jing Province. In the following year, the Wei government added 1,000 taxable households to his marquisate, bringing the total number up to 5,700. Two of Wang Ji's sons were enfeoffed as a village marquis and a secondary marquis respectively.

Sometime between 17 April and 16 May 261, Hu Lie, the Administrator of Xiangyang, reported that the Eastern Wu military officers Deng You and Li Guang were planning to lead 18 units to defect to Wei, and had already sent their subordinates Zhang Wu and Deng Sheng across the border. Upon receiving the news, Sima Zhao and the Wei imperial court ordered Wang Ji to mobilise the military units in all of Jing Province's commanderies, including Xiangyang, in preparation for a large-scale invasion of Eastern Wu with the aid of the defectors.

When Wang Ji heard about it, he suspected that Deng You and Li Guang were pretending to defect to Wei, so he wrote an urgent report to the central government: "We should check and confirm first. We should not rush into mobilising troops and sending them deep into enemy territory." He then wrote a follow-up report: 

Sima Zhao also found Deng You and Li Guang suspicious after receiving Wang Ji's two reports within such a short span of time. He immediately ordered the mobilised troops to stop at their current positions and await further orders. Wang Ji wrote again to Sima Zhao:  Sima Zhao immediately put the troops on high alert. He then wrote a letter to Wang Ji: "Many of those who work with me are simply sycophants hoping to gain my favour through flattery. Only a few dare to speak up and be candid towards me. You are known for your loyalty and love. You have often given me good advice. I shall heed your advice again." As Wang Ji suspected, Deng You and Li Guang were indeed pretending to defect to Wei as they did not show up as promised.

Death
Wang Ji died on 9 June 261 at the age of 72 (by East Asian age reckoning). The Wei government posthumously appointed him as Minister of Works and awarded him the posthumous title "Marquis Jing" along with the peerage "Marquis of Dongwu", which he declined in 258.

Fragments of Wang Ji's tombstone were discovered in Luoyang during the Qianlong era (1735–1795) of the Qing dynasty. The inscriptions are recorded in volume 56 of the Quan Sanguo Wen compiled by Yan Kejun in the 19th century.

Family
Wang Ji's son, Wang Hui, inherited his father's peerage and became the next Marquis of Dongwu, but died early. Sometime between 264 and 265, just before the Jin dynasty (266–420) replaced the Cao Wei state, the Cao Wei regime established a five-rank nobility system and made Wang Yi, a grandson of Wang Ji, the new Marquis of Dongwu. A new marquisate was created using the excess households from the Dongwu marquisate, and awarded to one of Wang Yi's sons under the title of a secondary marquis.

Wang Ji had a daughter, Wang Can, whose courtesy name was Nüyi. She married Sima Rong in 264, became his princess consort in 266 when he was enfeoffed as the Prince of Liang by the Jin dynasty, and died in 284. A tombstone was erected for her in 288 near Suiyang County (睢陽縣; present-day Suiyang District, Shangqiu, Henan).

In 266, after the Jin dynasty replaced the Cao Wei state, the Jin imperial court issued an edict as follows:

See also
 Lists of people of the Three Kingdoms

Notes

References

 Chen, Shou (3rd century). Records of the Three Kingdoms (Sanguozhi).
 
 Li, Daoyuan (6th century). Commentary on the Water Classic (Shui Jing Zhu).
 Pei, Songzhi (5th century). Annotations to Records of the Three Kingdoms (Sanguozhi zhu).
 
 Yan, Kejun (19th century). Quan Sanguo Wen.
 

190 births
261 deaths
Cao Wei generals
Cao Wei politicians
Politicians from Yantai
Political office-holders in Hebei
Political office-holders in Anhui
Political office-holders in Henan
Political office-holders in Hubei
Generals from Shandong
Three Rebellions in Shouchun